The North/South Consonance Ensemble is an American chamber ensemble dedicated to the performance of contemporary classical music from the Americas. It was founded in 1980 and is based in New York City. It is directed by the pianist and composer Max Lifchitz, who is also the ensemble's founder.

The ensemble has performed over 850 different works by composers from around the world and has released many CDs on its own label, North/South Recordings.

See also
Consonance

References

External links
North/South Consonance Ensemble site

Musicians in the North/South Consonance Ensemble recently performed their annual holiday concert at Christ and St. Stephen’s Church on West 69th Street. Funding for the concert came in part from the Music Performance Trust Fund, and musicians enjoyed the wages and benefits of a Local 802 contract.

Contemporary classical music ensembles
Musical groups established in 1980
Musical groups from New York City